The 69th season of the Campeonato Gaúcho kicked off on February 26, 1989, and ended on August 13, 1989. Fourteen teams participated. Holders Grêmio won their 27th title. São Paulo and Internacional de Santa Maria were relegated.

Participating teams

System 
The championship would have three stages. Three points were given for a win, and all ties led to penalty shootouts, the winner of which won two points and the loser one.:

 First phase: The fourteen clubs were divided into two groups of seven. In the first round, teams from one group played against teams from the other group once. In the second round, the teams from each group played in single round-robin format against the others in their group. In each round, the two best teams in each group would dispute a final quadrangular, also played in a single round-robin system, in which the best three teams would qualify to the Final hexagonal, receiving a number of bonus points according to their placing. In case the same teams qualified through the round quadrangulars, the remaining berths in the final hexagonal would be given to the teams with the best overall record. All the non-qualified teams would play the Relegation tournament. In addition, the best and the second-best eliminated team earned two and one bonus points, respectively, for the Relegation tournament.
 Relegation Tournament: The eight remaining teams played each other in a double round-robin system; the two teams with the fewest points were relegated.
 Final hexagonal: The six remaining teams played each other in a double round-robin system; the team with the most points won the title.

Championship

First phase

First round

Group 1

Group 2

Final quadrangular

Second round

Group 1

Group 2

Final quadrangular

Final standings

Relegation tournament

Final hexagonal

References 

Campeonato Gaúcho seasons
Gaúcho